Polesye Stadium is a multi-purpose stadium in Luninets, Belarus. It is currently used as a home ground of Granit from the neighboring town of Mikashevichi. The stadium is an all-seater and  has a capacity of 3,090 people. The stadium was previously used by local team FC Luninets, before it went defunct. It was occupied by Granit in mid-2000s.

References

External links
Profile at pressball.by
Stadium profile at the FC Granit official site

Football venues in Belarus
Buildings and structures in Brest Region